Itemirella is an extinct genus of prehistoric anuran of the Bissekty Formation, Uzbekistan.

See also
 Prehistoric amphibian
 List of prehistoric amphibians

References

Cretaceous amphibians of Asia
Turonian life
Fossils of Uzbekistan
Bissekty Formation
Fossil taxa described in 1981